The 1932 Wightman Cup was the tenth edition of the annual women's team tennis competition between the United States and Great Britain. It was held on 10 and 11 June at the All England Lawn Tennis and Croquet Club in London, England.

See also
 1932 Davis Cup

References

Wightman Cups by year
Wightman Cup, 1932
Wightman Cup
Wightman Cup
Wightman Cup
Wightman Cup